DeAundre "Dee" Alford (born November 5, 1997) is an American football cornerback for the Atlanta Falcons of the National Football League (NFL). He won the 2021 Grey Cup with the Winnipeg Blue Bombers as a starter in his first season, defeating the Hamilton Tiger-Cats 33-25. He played college football at Tusculum.

College career
Alford played college football for the Tusculum Pioneers from 2016 to 2019 where he played in 40 games and recorded 140 tackles and 10 interceptions. He also had 40 passes defended as a Pioneer, which is a school record.

Professional career

Winnipeg Blue Bombers

Following his collegiate career, Alford signed with the Winnipeg Blue Bombers on February 10, 2020. However, due to the COVID-19 pandemic, he did not play in 2020 and several of his pro day workouts were canceled.

After completing training camp with the Blue Bombers in 2021, Alford won a starting job at cornerback and played in his first professional game on August 5, 2021, against the Hamilton Tiger-Cats where he recorded six defensive tackles. On September 18, 2021, he recorded his first career interception and first career touchdown as he picked off Edmonton Elks quarterback Taylor Cornelius and returned it 20 yards for the score. He finished the game with two tackles, two interceptions, and a forced fumble and was named the CFL's top performer of the week. Alford had a strong season with the Bombers, finishing as a CFL All-Star in his first season. He would help the Bombers' league-leading defense to their second consecutive Grey Cup title as they defeated the Tiger-Cats 33-25.

Atlanta Falcons
On January 10, 2022, Alford signed a reserve/future contract with the Atlanta Falcons.

On October 2, 2022, during a Falcons game against the Cleveland Browns, he would make a game-sealing interception on a pass thrown by Jacoby Brissett to win the game 23-20.

Personal life
Alford was born in Hernando, Mississippi and grew up in Griffin, Georgia.

References

External links

Atlanta Falcons bio

1997 births
Living people
American football defensive backs
Atlanta Falcons players
Canadian football defensive backs
People from Griffin, Georgia
Players of American football from Georgia (U.S. state)
Tusculum Pioneers football players
Winnipeg Blue Bombers players